Love Songs is a compilation album by English musician Elton John. The album was first released on 6 November 1995 by John's own label The Rocket Record Company, in conjunction with Mercury Records. The album was released in North America by MCA Records almost a year after the European release, on 24 September 1996. In the US, it was certified gold in December 1996, platinum in March 1997, 2× platinum in December 1998 and 3× platinum in August 2000 by the RIAA.

The album was a major success upon its release, topping the albums charts in three countries, was certified platinum in 11 countries and multi-platinum in 7. The album also spawned a music video compilation, which was originally released on laserdisc, VHS, and VCD.

Background 
John had originally released an album called Love Songs in 1982 through his own label, The Rocket Record Company. It mostly concentrated on the period between 1976 and 1982, when John and Bernie Taupin took a break in their collaboration. John was mostly writing with other lyricists such as Gary Osborne and Tim Rice on that period. "Blue Eyes" and "Sorry Seems to Be the Hardest Word" are the only two songs from that album are featured in this new collection. 

On the US version, ten of the fifteen tracks had been released in the period since the now-deleted Greatest Hits Volume 3 collection, including John's second tenure on MCA and two songs from the then-recent Made in England. (Two of these tracks, however, were live versions of old songs, namely "Candle in the Wind" and "Don't Let the Sun Go Down on Me"). "You Can Make History (Young Again)" and "No Valentines" were the two new songs made specifically for this release. 

The UK version saw an alternate track order with the inclusion of such songs as "I Guess That's Why They Call It the Blues", "Nikita", "True Love" (a duet with Kiki Dee), "Please", "Song for Guy", and the original version of "Candle in the Wind". In addition, "Blessed" is represented as the single edit on both versions.  "You Can Make History (Young Again)" and "No Valentines" do not appear on this version since they were recorded after its release.

Track listing 
All songs written by Elton John and Bernie Taupin, except where noted.

Notes 
Due to a production error, the US CD booklet and cassette lyric sheet provide the lyrics for "I Guess That's Why They Call It the Blues" directly after "Candle in the Wind".
The phonographic copyright of the compilation is owned by William A. Bong Ltd. and is exclusively licensed to Mercury Records Ltd.

Music video compilation 
 "Sacrifice"
 "Candle in the Wind (Live in Australia, 1984)"
 "I Guess That's Why They Call It the Blues"
 "Don't Let the Sun Go Down on Me" (Live duet with George Michael)
 "Sorry Seems to Be the Hardest Word (Live in Barcelona, 1992)"
 "Blue Eyes"
 "Daniel (Live in Australia, 1984)"
 "Nikita"
 "Your Song (Live at Wembley Stadium, 1984)"
 "The One"
 "Someone Saved My Life Tonight (Live in Edinburgh, 1976)"
 "True Love" (Duet with Kiki Dee)
 "Can You Feel the Love Tonight"
 "Circle of Life"
 "Blessed"
 "Please"
 "Song for Guy (Live in Australia, 1984)"
 "Believe"

Charts

Weekly charts

Year-end charts

Certifications

Release history

References

External links 
Lyrics for Love Songs at BernieTaupin.com

1995 greatest hits albums
Albums produced by Gus Dudgeon
Albums produced by Chris Thomas (record producer)
Elton John compilation albums
Mercury Records compilation albums
The Rocket Record Company compilation albums
Albums recorded at Trident Studios